The Democratic Pacific Union is an international non-governmental organization which promotes political democracy, strengthens maritime culture and marine technology, and replaces rigid, aggressive hegemony with the soft powers of love, peace, cooperation and sharing within the Pacific Ocean. The organization was established in Taipei, Republic of China on August 14, 2005, and former Vice President of the Republic of China, Annette Lu is its current chairperson.

Members
Member states are listed alphabetically by continent

References

External links
 Official website

Organizations established in 2005
International organizations based in China
International organizations based in Asia